Xenophrys auralensis (Aural horned frog;) is a species of frog in the family Megophryidae. It is endemic to Cambodia where it is only known from Phnom Aural, the highest mountain of Cambodia. Its type locality is within the Phnom Aural Wildlife Sanctuary. Its natural habitats are tropical moist lowland forests, moist montane forests, and rivers.

References

auralensis
Endemic fauna of Cambodia
Amphibians of Cambodia
Taxonomy articles created by Polbot
Amphibians described in 2002